Rambak petis is a Javanese snack food, made of deep fried cow hide served with petis, a sauce made from sweet soya sauce and fermented prawn paste. It is traditionally served as an appetizer.

See also

 List of deep fried foods

References 

Javanese cuisine
Appetizers
Beef dishes
Deep fried foods
Indonesian beef dishes